Berthier—Montcalm was a federal electoral district in Quebec, Canada, that was represented in the House of Commons of Canada from 1988 to 2004.

This riding was created in 1987 from Berthier—Maskinongé—Lanaudière riding. It was abolished in 2003 when it was redistributed into Berthier—Maskinongé, Laurentides—Labelle, Montcalm and Rivière-du-Nord ridings.

Berthier—Montcalm consisted of the towns of Berthierville, Louiseville and Saint-Gabriel; parts of the Counties of Berthier, Joliette, Maskinongé, Montcalm, and Saint-Maurice. In 1996, the riding was redefined to consist of the cities of Berthierville, Laurentides and Saint-Gabriel, the county regional municipalities of Montcalm, D'Autray and Matawinie (including Manouane Indian Reserve No. 26), and the Village Municipality of New Glasgow and the Municipality of Sainte-Sophie in the County Regional Municipality of La Rivière-du-Nord.

Members of Parliament

This riding has elected the following Members of Parliament:

Electoral history

|-
  
|Progressive Conservative
|Robert de Cotret
|align="right"|29,370 
  
|Liberal
|Maurice Roberge
|align="right"|13,624
 
|New Democratic
|Pierre Arès
|align="right"|5,883 

 
|No affiliation
|Antonio Yanakis
|align="right"|1,292

  
|Liberal
|Madeleine Bélanger
|align="right"|16,133
  
|Progressive Conservative
|Réal Naud
|align="right"|5,358 
  
|Natural Law
|Réal Croteau
|align="right"|804   
 
|New Democratic
|Jean-Pierre de Billy
|align="right"|591 

  
|Liberal
|Lise Perreault
|align="right"|15,073 
  
|Progressive Conservative
|Réal Naud
|align="right"|13,338
 
|New Democratic
|Jean-Pierre de Billy
|align="right"|1,009   

  
|Liberal
|Jean-Carle Hudon
|align="right"|16,675 

  
|Progressive Conservative
|Paul Lavigne
|align="right"|2,014 

 
|New Democratic
|Jean-Pierre de Billy
|align="right"|829  

  
|Liberal
|Richard Giroux
|align="right"|11,646  
 
|New Democratic
|François Rivest
|align="right"|977   
  
|Progressive Conservative
|Richard Lafleur
|align="right"|598

See also 

 List of Canadian federal electoral districts
 Past Canadian electoral districts

External links 
 Riding history from the Library of Parliament

Former federal electoral districts of Quebec